Pak In-chol is a North Korean politician who is serving since January 2023 as the Chairman of the Supreme People's Assembly, North Korea's unicameral parliament.

Biography
in January 2021, at the 8th Party Congress, he was elected as a candidate member of the 8th Central Committee. He also served as chairman of the General Federation of Trade Unions of Korea. At the 8th session of the 14th Supreme People's Assembly, he was elected as the Chairman of the Supreme People's Assembly.

References 

Members of the 8th Central Committee of the Workers' Party of Korea
Place of birth missing (living people)
Members of the Supreme People's Assembly